Sisyphism is a term used by French classical liberal theorist, political economist, and member of the French assembly, Frédéric Bastiat to ridicule those that think that greater productivity causes poverty by increasing unemployment.  The term derives from Sisyphus, the mythological king of Ephyra, punished for chronic deceitfulness by being compelled to roll an immense boulder up a hill, only to watch it roll back down, and to repeat this action forever.

References

Economic growth
Economics catchphrases
Secondary sector of the economy
Poverty
Production economics
Unemployment